The Thirty Million Dollar Rush (Chinese: 橫財三千萬) is a 1987 Hong Kong action comedy film written, produced, directed by and starring Karl Maka. The film co-stars Brigitte Lin, Paula Tsui, Eric Tsang, Lau Kar-leung, Angile Leung and Mark Cheng.

Plot
Fatty (Eric Tsang) is an employee at a mint, where one day, he discovers a shredding machine that crashed for a moment before resuming its operations. Because of that moment, an amount of HK$30 million of bank notes, which were meant to be shredded, survived. Discovering this secret, Fatty conspires with his friends, Tomboy (Angile Leung) and Mark Mark Cheng), to steal the money for themselves. Seeking for professional help, the trio join forces with Baldy (Karl Maka), an ex-con recently released from prison. While discussing their plan, they were overheard by a Catholic nun, Sister Maria (Brigitte Lin), who is determined to prevent them from committing sins in order to save their souls.

Cast
Karl Maka as Baldy
Brigitte Lin as Sister Maria
Paula Tsui as Designer Fung
Eric Tsang as Fatty
Lau Kar-leung as Boxer Leung
Angile Leung as Tomboy
Mark Cheng as Mark
Wong Ching as Inspector Chu
John Woo as Ling's husband (cameo)
Wong Jing as Pimp Tak (cameo)
Amy Wu as Ling
Chan Chi-fai as Whoremonger
Eddie Chan as Whoremonger
Maria Tung as TV reporter
Chang Kwok-tse as Bicycle kiosk owner
Joe Chu as Whoremonger
Sai Gwa-Pau as Man in toilet
Wellington Fung as Engineer
Tony Chow as Fatty's assistant manager
Garry Chan as Hawker assistant
Ling Lai-man as Keung

Theme song
Dream of Fortune
Composer: Alvin Kwok
Lyricist: Raymond Wong
Singer: Samuel Hui

Reception

Critical
Andrew Saroch of Far East Films rated the film a score of three out of five stars and calls it an "enjoyable comedy mixes the familiar ingredients of fast-paced comedy, spurts of action and thin plot, alongside a cast of welcome faces" but criticizes the film for its lack of order and some over-the-top performances.

Box office
The film grossed HK$13,545,285 at the Hong Kong box office during its theatrical run from 2 to 17 July 1987.

References

External links

The Thirty Million Dollar Rush at Hong Kong Cinemagic

1987 films
1980s action comedy films
Hong Kong action comedy films
Hong Kong slapstick comedy films
Hong Kong heist films
1980s Cantonese-language films
Films set in Hong Kong
Films shot in Hong Kong
1987 comedy films
1980s Hong Kong films